Nikos Vergos (born 13 January 1996) is a Greek professional footballer who plays as a striker for Super League club Lamia, on loan from Wolfsberger AC.

Career
Vergos is a product of the youth system of Olympiacos and was considered as one of the most talented players of his generation.

Nikos Vergos made his debut on 25 September 2013, in a Greek Football Cup match against Fokikos F.C. as a substitute in the 38th minute.

On 19 March 2014, he was subbed on to replace David Fuster in a Champions League match against Manchester United F.C. in the Round of 16.

Vergos made his Superleague Greece debut on 23 March 2014 on an away game against Ergotelis as a substitute in the 72nd minute. Three days later on 26 March on an away game against Asteras Tripolis he made his second appearance as a substitute in the 60th minute replacing Giannis Maniatis and seconds later on his first touch he managed to score his first goal with a powerful header.

On 20 August 2015, he signed for Segunda División club Elche on a one-year loan from Olympiacos.

On 24 August 2016, he was loaned out for a year to Spanish club Real Madrid Castilla from Super League Greece club Olympiacos. On 4 September 2016, he made his debut with the club as a substitute in a 3–2 home win against SD Amorebieta. On 15 October 2016, he scored his first goal with the club, in his second appearance against UD Socuéllamos. On 5 March 2017, he scored a brace leading the team to a 3–1 away win against UD Socuéllamos. He scored his first goal after he catching the rebound from Campuzano’s shot  and five minutes later, the Greek player scored again to make it 2–1 after taking advantage of a long pass from Tejero, cutting back on his right foot before beating Kevin with his left.
On 13 March 2017, he was the only scorer in a 1–0 home win against Zamudio SD, which gave Castilla their second consecutive win.

On 28 August 2017, was loaned out for a season to Hungarian club Vasas from Superleague Greece club Olympiacos. On 9 January 2018 he returned to Olympiacos.

After returning to Olympiacos in January from an unsuccessful loan spell at Vasas, Vergos failed to make an impression on new head coach Pedro Martins, something which resulted in him being released. On 21 August 2018, Panathinaikos signed Vergos on a three-year deal as a free agent from Olympiacos, which kept a resale rate of 20%. On 13 January 2020, he was loaned out to Segunda División B club Hércules CF from Panathinaikos. On 4 August 2020, Panetolikos signed Vergos in a two-year deal as a free agent from Panathinaikos. On 30 May 2021, the 25-year-old striker scored a penalty in the 83rd minute of the second leg of a relegation play-off game, in which Panetolikos F.C. defeated Xanthi F.C. Having already scored a precious away goal on the first leg, his goals secured their place in Greece's top flight.

Honours
Olympiacos
Super League: 2013–14, 2014–15
Greek Cup: 2015

References

External links
Myplayer.gr Profile

1996 births
Living people
Footballers from Kilkis
Greek footballers
Association football forwards
Super League Greece players
Segunda División players
Segunda División B players
Nemzeti Bajnokság I players
Olympiacos F.C. players
Elche CF players
Real Madrid Castilla footballers
Vasas SC players
Panathinaikos F.C. players
Hércules CF players
Panetolikos F.C. players
Wolfsberger AC players
PAS Lamia 1964 players
Greece youth international footballers
Greece under-21 international footballers
Greek expatriate footballers
Expatriate footballers in Spain
Greek expatriate sportspeople in Spain
Expatriate footballers in Hungary
Greek expatriate sportspeople in Hungary
Expatriate footballers in Austria
Greek expatriate sportspeople in Austria